The Royal Society for the Encouragement of Arts, Manufactures and Commerce (RSA), also known as the Royal Society of Arts or more commonly by its acronym RSA, is a London-based organisation committed to finding practical solutions to social challenges.

The RSA's mission expressed in the founding charter was to "embolden enterprise, enlarge science, refine art, improve our manufacturers and extend our commerce", but also of the need to alleviate poverty and secure full employment. On its website, the RSA characterises itself as "an enlightenment organisation committed to finding innovative practical solutions to today's social challenges".

Notable past Fellows (before 1914, Members) include Charles Dickens, Benjamin Franklin, Stephen Hawking, Karl Marx, Adam Smith, Marie Curie, Nelson Mandela, David Attenborough, Judi Dench, William Hogarth, John Diefenbaker, and Tim Berners-Lee. Today, the RSA has fellows elected from 80 countries worldwide.

History

Founded in 1754 by William Shipley as the Society for the Encouragement of Arts, Manufactures and Commerce, it was granted a Royal Charter in 1847, and the right to use the term "Royal" in its name by King Edward VII in 1908. Members of the society became known as "fellows" from 1914 onwards.

In the nineteenth century, The Great Exhibition of the Works of Industry of All Nations was organised by Prince Albert, Henry Cole, Francis Henry, George Wallis, Charles Dilke and other members of the society as a celebration of modern industrial technology and design.

Leadership
The RSA's Patron was Elizabeth II. The RSA's president is The Princess Royal (who replaced her father, The Duke of Edinburgh, in 2011), its Chairman is Tim Eyles, and its Chief Executive since September 2021 is former Bank of England Chief Economist Andy Haldane.

Presidents

Fellowship

Fellowship is granted to applicants "who are aligned with the RSA's vision and share in our values." Some prospective fellows are approached by the RSA and invited to join in recognition of their work; some are nominated or "fast-tracked" by existing fellows and RSA staff, or by partner organisations such as the Churchill Fellowship; others make their own applications with accompanied references, which are reviewed by a formal admissions panel consisting of RSA trustees and fellowship councillors. As of 2022, the RSA has adopted an inclusive policy and stated that acceptance to the fellowship does not require the applicant to be "a leader in your industry or a CEO of an NGO but they must demonstrate excellence in their field of practice and be recognised for their contributions".

Fellows of the RSA are entitled to use the post-nominal letters "FRSA" after their name. They also gain access to the RSA Library and to other premises in central London. Fellows pay an annual charitable subscription to the RSA. Alongside this, all new Fellows pay a one-off registration fee.

Prizes
Originally modelled on the Dublin Society for improving Husbandry, Manufacturers and other Useful Arts, the RSA, from its foundation, offered prizes through a Premium Award Scheme that continued for 100 years. Medals and, in some cases, money were awarded to individuals who achieved success in published challenges within the categories of Agriculture, Polite Arts, Manufacture, Colonies and Trade, Chemistry and Mechanics. Successful submission included agricultural improvements in the cultivation of crops and reforestation, devising new forms of machinery, including an extendable ladder to aid firefighting that has remained in use relatively unchanged, and artistic skill, through submissions by young students, many of whom developed into famous artists e.g. Edwin Landseer who at the age of 10 was awarded a silver medal for his drawing of a dog.

The RSA originally specifically precluded premiums for patented solutions. Today the RSA continues to offer premiums.

The RSA awards three medals – the Albert Medal, the Benjamin Franklin Medal, and the Bicentenary Medal. Medal winners have included Nelson Mandela, Sir Frank Whittle, and Professor Stephen Hawking.

Royal Designers for Industry 
In 1936, the RSA awarded the first distinctions of Royal Designers for Industry (RDI or HonRDI), reserved for "those very few who in the judgment of their peers have achieved 'sustained excellence in aesthetic and efficient design for industry'".

In 1937, "The Faculty of Royal Designers for Industry" was established as an association with the object of "furthering excellence in design and its application to industrial purposes": membership of the Faculty is automatic for (and exclusive to) all RDIs and HonRDIs. The Faculty currently has 120 Royal Designers (RDI) and 45 Honorary Royal Designers (non-British citizens who are awarded the accolade of HonRDI): the number of designers who may hold the distinction of RDI at any one time is strictly limited.

The Faculty consists of practitioners from fields as disparate as engineering, graphics, interaction, product, furniture, fashion, interiors, landscape, and urban design. Past and present members include Eric Gill, Enid Marx, Sir Frank Whittle, Sir Jonathan Ive, Dame Vivienne Westwood, Sir James Dyson, Sir Tim Berners-Lee, Manolo Blahnik, Naoto Fukasawa, Rei Kawakubo, Issey Miyake, Dieter Rams, Sergio Pininfarina, Alvar Aalto, Vico Magistretti, Walter Gropius, Charles Eames, Richard Buckminster Fuller, Saul Bass, Raymond Loewy, George Nelson, Paul Rand, Carlo Scarpa, Vuokko Nurmesniemi, Massimo Vignelli, Yohji Yamamoto, Peter Zumthor, and more.

Activities
In Great Britain and Ireland, the RSA offers regional activities to encourage Fellows to address local topics of interest and to connect with other Fellows in their locality. The British Regions are: London, Central, North, Scotland, South East, South West, Wales and, Ireland. The RSA has a presence around the world under its RSA Global scheme with a notable presence in Australia, New Zealand and the USA.

Events

The RSA's public events programme is a key part of its charitable mission to make world-changing ideas and debate freely available to all. Over 100 keynote lectures, panel discussions, debates, and documentary screenings are held each year, many of which are live-streamed over the web. Events are free and open to the public, and mp3 audio files and videos are made available on the RSA's website and YouTube page.

Recent speakers on the RSA's stage have included Sir Ken Robinson, Al Gore, Sir David Attenborough, Alain de Botton, Michael Sandel, Nassim Nicholas Taleb, Martha Nussbaum, Desmond Tutu, Steven Pinker, Susan Cain, Dan Pink, Dan Ariely, Brene Brown, Slavoj Zizek, David Cameron, and Dambisa Moyo.

The choice of speaker for the recent annual Presidential lecture has been a matter of interest in the press. Danish professor Björn Lomborg, was chosen; his latest book, Cool It, suggests that the imminent demise of polar bears is a myth. As president of the RSA, Prince Philip's first choice of speaker was Ian Plimer, professor of mineral geology at Adelaide University, but this was rejected as too controversial, as Plimer argues that the theory of Anthropogenic Global Warming is unproven.

On 14 January 2010, the RSA in partnership with Arts Council England hosted a one-day conference in London called "State of the Arts". A number of speakers from various disciplines from art to government gathered to talk about the state of the arts industry in the United Kingdom. Notable speakers included Jeremy Hunt MP, Secretary of State for Culture, Media & Sport and his counterpart Ben Bradshaw MP, who was then the Secretary of State for Culture, Media & Sport.

RSA Animate (animation series)
Excerpts from the events programme form the basis for the 10-minute whiteboard animations as shown on the theRSAorg YouTube channel. The series was created as a way of making important, socially-beneficial ideas as accessible, clear, engaging and universal as possible. The series is produced and audio-edited at the RSA, and the animations are created by RSA Fellow Andrew Park at Cognitive.

The first 14 of these had gained 46 million views as of 2011, making it the no.1 nonprofit YouTube channel worldwide. The first animation in the RSA Animate series was based on Renata Salecl's speech delivered for RSA on her book about choice.

Projects

The Society offered the first national public examinations in 1882 that led to the formation of the RSA Examinations Board now included in the Oxford, Cambridge and RSA Examinations Board.

In 1876, a predecessor of the Royal College of Music, the National Training School for Music, was founded by the RSA.

The RSA devised a scheme for commemorating the links between famous people and buildings, by placing plaques on the walls – these continue today as "blue plaques" which have been administered by a range of government bodies. The first of these plaques was, in fact, of red terracotta erected outside a former residence of Lord Byron (since demolished). The Society erected 36 plaques until, in 1901, responsibility for them was transferred to the London County Council (which changed the colour of the plaques to the current blue) and, later, the Greater London Council (the G.L.C.) and, most recently, English Heritage. Similar schemes are now operated in all the constituent countries of the United Kingdom.

In 1929, The Society purchased the entire village of West Wycombe. After extensive repairs, the village was legally conveyed by deed to the National Trust.

During the 1980s, the RSA worked with the Comino Foundation and established a Comino Fellowship Committee 'to change the cultural attitude to industry from one of lack of interest or dislike to one of concern and esteem'. This eventually led to a joint government/industry initiative to promote 1986 as "Industry Year", with the RSA and the Comino Foundation providing core funding of £250,000 – which persuaded the Confederation of British Industry to raise £1 million and government departments to provide £3 million.

In July 2008, the RSA became a sponsor of an academy in Tipton, The RSA Academy, which opened in September 2008. A New building for the school was completed in September 2010. In 2021 it was announced that the school would no longer be associated with the RSA. Projects include Arts and Ecology, Citizen Power, Connected Communities, Design and Society, Education, Public Services, Social Brain, and Technology in a Cold Climate. There are six schools in the RSA Family of Academies, all in the West Midlands, including Whitley Academy. The former RSA Academy in Tipton was also a member, until its disassociation in 2021.

Past projects include delivering fresh drinking water to the developing world, rethinking intellectual property from first principles to produce a Charter (published as the Adelphi Charter), investigating schemes to manage international migration and exploring the feasibility of a UK-wide personal carbon trading system. It still promotes the practice of inclusive design, and is working with artists to communicate ideas about environmental sustainability (for example, through one of the RSA's past projects, WEEE Man, and currently through the Arts and Ecology project).

The RSA has been home to TEDxLambeth, a TEDx conference based in Lambeth, since October 2019.

RSA House

The RSA moved to its current home in 1774. The House, situated in John Adam Street, near the Strand in central London, had been purpose-designed by the Adam Brothers (James Adam and Robert Adam) as part of their innovative Adelphi scheme. The original building (6–8 John Adam Street) includes the Great Room, which features a magnificent sequence of paintings by Irish artist James Barry titled The Progress of Human Knowledge and Culture and portraits of the Society's first and second presidents, painted by Thomas Gainsborough and Joshua Reynolds respectively. On the RSA building's rear frieze, the words "The Royal Society of Arts" are displayed (see photograph at right), although its full name is "The Royal Society for the Encouragement of Arts, Manufactures and Commerce".

The RSA has expanded into adjacent buildings, and now includes 2 and 4 John Adam Street and 18 Adam Street. The first occupant of 18 Adam Street was the Adelphi Tavern, which is mentioned in Dickens's The Pickwick Papers. The former private dining room of the Tavern contains a magnificent Adam ceiling with painted roundels by the school of Kauffman and Zucchi.

A major refurbishment in 2012 by Matthew Lloyd Architects won a RIBA London Award in 2013, and a RIBA English Heritage Award for Sustaining the Historic Environment, also in 2013.

Associated organisations
The origin of London's Royal Academy of Arts lies in an attempt in 1755 by members of the RSA (then simply known as the Society for the Encouragement of Arts, Manufactures and Commerce), principally the sculptor Henry Cheere, to found an autonomous academy of arts to teach painting and sculpture. Prior to this a number of artists were members of the RSA, including Cheere and William Hogarth, or were involved in small-scale private art academies, such as the St Martin's Lane Academy. Although Cheere's attempt failed, the eventual charter, called an 'Instrument', used to establish the Royal Academy of Arts over a decade later was almost identical to that drawn up by Cheere and the RSA in 1755. The RSA also hosted the first exhibition of contemporary art in 1760. Thomas Gainsborough and Joshua Reynolds were among those who exhibited at this first exhibition, and were subsequently founder members of The Royal Academy of Arts in 1768.

An 1852 photography exhibition led to the creation of the Photographic Society of London in 1853.

See also
 First Exhibition (1760)
 Society for the Encouragement of Arts, Manufactures and Commerce

References

Further reading
 Wood, Henry Trueman. A history of the Royal Society of Arts (London: Murray, 1913).
 Lloyd, Matthew and Schilling, Mikael. "The Royal Society of Arts", Journal of Architectural Conservation (Routledge, Taylor & Francis Group, 2014)

External links

Journal of the Society of Arts (1783–1843)
Journal of the Society of Arts (1852–1908)
Journal of the Royal Society of Arts (1908–1987)
RSA Journal (1987–2019)

 
Cultural organisations based in the United Kingdom
Arts in the United Kingdom
Organizations established in 1754
Grade I listed buildings in the City of Westminster
Grade I listed institutional headquarters
Learned societies of the United Kingdom
1754 establishments in Great Britain